Begijnendijk is a municipality located in the Belgian province of Flemish Brabant. The municipality comprises the towns of Begijnendijk proper and Betekom. On January 1, 2006, Begijnendijk had a total population of 9,400. The total area is 17.62 km² which gives a population density of 534 inhabitants per km². The official spoken language is Dutch.

Further reading 
 2008 "De boerekes van Betekom" written by Bob Michiels
 2005 "Begijnendijk, dorp van kerkenbouwers"
 2003 "De vergane glorie van Betekom" written by Pascal Van Vlasselaer
 1997 "De parochies St. Lucia en St. Laurentius van Begijnendijk-Betekom voot 1901" written by H. Guislain
 1996 "Begijnendijk voor 1796" written by Geert Andries
 1996 "Betekom op de schoolbanken" written by Vermeulen-Vandenbussche, Trees
 1995 "Volkstelling van Betekom en Begijnendijk"
 1995 "Nota's uit de rekeningen der St.Laurentiuskerk: 1715, 1751,1757,1762,1775, XIXe en XXe eeuw" 
 1995 "De oude molen van Betekom"
 1994 "Hoe Begijnendijk ontstond als aparte gemeente op 8 maart 1796"

References

External links

Official website - Available only in Dutch

Municipalities of Flemish Brabant